Black Cocaine is an EP by hip hop duo Mobb Deep, and the duo's first release following Prodigy's release from prison. The project was announced by producer The Alchemist through his Twitter account. The songs "Conquer", "Get It Forever" and "Waterboarding" were later featured as bonus tracks on their 2014 album The Infamous Mobb Deep.

Sales
The extended play sold 5,000 copies in its first week. As of March 1, 2012 the EP has sold 15,100 copies in the US.

Track listing
Track listing confirmed by HipHopDX

Charts

References

2011 EPs
Mobb Deep albums
Gangsta rap EPs
Albums produced by the Alchemist (musician)
Albums produced by Havoc (musician)
Albums produced by J.U.S.T.I.C.E. League
Albums produced by Beat Butcha